The Southern Railway is a railway in Austria that runs from Vienna to Graz and the border with Slovenia at Spielfeld via Semmering and Bruck an der Mur. Along with the Spielfeld-Straß–Trieste railway (lying largely in Slovenia), it forms part of the Austrian Southern Railway that connected Vienna with Trieste, the main seaport of the Austro-Hungarian Monarchy, via Ljubljana. A main obstacle in its construction was getting over the Semmering Pass over the Northern Limestone Alps. The twin-track, electrified section that runs through the current territory of Austria is owned and operated by Austrian Federal Railways (ÖBB) and is one of the major lines in the country.

History
1829: Austrian railway pioneer Franz Xaver Riepl proposed a railway connection from Vienna to the Adriatic Sea, bypassing the Eastern Alps and running via Bruck an der Leitha, Magyaróvár and Szombathely (through the west edge of Hungary, avoiding the Alps), and then Maribor and Ljubljana to Trieste. His plans were adopted by entrepreneur Georgios Sinas. At the same time plans for a direct connection through the Alps were developed and promoted by Archduke John of Austria to open up the Styrian lands beyond Semmering Pass.
1836: Sinas had engineer Matthias von Schönerer build the first stretch of line from Vienna to Győr (Raab), Hungary with a branch-off to Bratislava.

1838: Sinas established the private Wien-Raaber Eisenbahn (WRB) company with 12.5 million florins of share capital.
1839: Departing from the original plans of a connection via Hungary, construction works started on the initial section which ran southwards between Baden, Lower Austria and Wiener Neustadt. Schönerer had travelled to the US, where he bought a used steam locomotive named Philadelphia, built by the Norris Locomotive Works in 1837.
16 May 1841. This section opened. Soon after, the railway was extended to Mödling and Neunkirchen.
1841: Ghega started to survey the terrain of the Semmering Pass.
5 May 1842: The line from Wien Südbahnhof (Southern Station) was completed to Gloggnitz at the northern foot of the Semmering Pass. Most goods traffic ran on the parallel Wiener Neustadt Canal (also leased by Sinas), but passenger figures continuously increased.
1844: Sinas had the construction of the railway to Hungary (the present-day Eastern Railway) resumed.
21 October 1844: South of the Semmering Pass, the line from Graz northward to Mürzzuschlag (decided on by the Austrian government) (led by engineer Carl Ritter von Ghega) opened.
2 June 1846: The southern continuation to Celje was inaugurated.
March 1848: The Revolutions of 1848 in the Austrian Empire started.
1849: Extended to Ljubljana. Passengers still had to use the stagecoach across the Semmering Pass
1853: The k.k. Südliche Staatsbahn nationalised the Vienna–Gloggnitz line.
1848 to 1854: The section over the Semmering Pass was built.
17 July 1854: The direct railway connection from Vienna to Ljubljana was inaugurated.
1854 to 1857: The final section across the Karst Plateau was built.
12 July 1857: The first through train from Vienna to Trieste ran.
23 May 1858: The railway was sold to the newly established Austrian Southern Railway stock company.
1 June 1859: The last section of the North Italy extension was finished near Magenta, Lombardy.
4 June 1859: The Austrian Army was defeated at the Battle of Magenta.
1859: In the Second Italian War of Independence Austria lost Lombardy and with it the Lombardy section of the Southern Railway. 
1860: The connection to Milan was opened.
1866: The Peace of Prague ended the Third Italian War of Independence. Austria lost Venetia and with it the Venetia section of the Southern Railway.

1919 Treaty of Saint-Germain. Dissolution of Austria-Hungary after World War I. Austria lost all the Southern Railway south of the station at Spielfeld, Styria, which became a border station to Šentilj in the Kingdom of Serbs, Croats and Slovenes (Kingdom of Yugoslavia from 1929, present-day Slovenia).
1923: The Austrian Federal Railways took over.
1945 and after: During the Cold War trade between Vienna and Trieste was mainly run through Tarvisio.
1963: By now the tracks from Vienna through Tarvisio to Trieste had been electrified.
1966: By now the tracks from Vienna to Graz and Yugoslavia had been electrified.
2007: Border controls were abolished with Slovenia's accession to the Schengen Area.
12 September 2007: A very high value collectors' coin (the Austrian Southern Railways Vienna-Triest commemorative coin) was minted: its obverse shows the locomotive "Steinbrück" with one of the typical viaducts of the Semmering Railway in the background. The engine “Steinbrück” can be seen today in the Technical Museum in Vienna. It is the oldest existing locomotive built in Austria; it was built in 1848 for the Southern Railway.

Train service
While the connection between Vienna and Graz, partly provided by ÖBB Railjet high-speed trains, is busy, international passenger traffic to Trieste has decreased in past decades. Nevertheless, the railway is to be developed by the Semmering Base Tunnel and the Koralm Railway branch-off to Klagenfurt, Carinthia. The section from Graz to the Slovenian border, which had been downgraded to a single track railway in the 1950s, is currently again enlarged to double track.

Within the Vienna metropolitan region, the sections between new Vienna Central Station, Wien Meidling, Mödling, Leobersdorf and Wiener Neustadt Hauptbahnhof are also part of the suburban Vienna S-Bahn railway network.

Notes

References

External links
 
 Wien-Südbahnhof: Photogallery and documentation about the Vienna Southern Railway Station (Wien-Südbahnhof) by Martin Frey and Philipp Graf
 

Railway lines in Austria
Lower Austria
Styria
Baden District, Austria
Bruck-Mürzzuschlag District
Murtal District
Mödling District
Neunkirchen District, Austria
Wiener Neustadt-Land District